Henri Timmermann (born 14 December 1874, date of death unknown) was a Belgian racing cyclist. He rode in the 1923 Tour de France.

References

1874 births
Year of death missing
Belgian male cyclists
Place of birth missing